Group B was one of the two groups of the 2016 AFF Championship. It consisted of hosts Myanmar, Malaysia, Vietnam and qualification round winners Cambodia. Play in Group B began on 20 November and ended on 26 November.

Teams

Group standings 

In the semi-finals:
Vietnam advanced to play against Indonesia (runners-up of Group A).
Myanmar advanced to play against Thailand (winners of Group A).

Matches 
All times are in local, Myanmar Time (UTC+06:30).

Malaysia vs Cambodia

Myanmar vs Vietnam

Malaysia vs Vietnam

Cambodia vs Myanmar

Vietnam vs Cambodia

Myanmar vs Malaysia

References

External links 
 AFF Suzuki Cup 2016 – Official website

Group stage